José Touré (born 24 April 1961 in Nancy) is a French former professional football player.

Club career
On 11 June 1983, Touré scored a memorable goal for Nantes in the Coupe de France final to give his side the lead against Paris Saint-Germain, however Nantes eventually fell to a 3–2 defeat.

On 10 June 1987, Touré started for Bordeaux against Marseille in the final of the 1986–87 Coupe de France, with his side coming out 2–0 winners.

International career
Touré was a member of the French squad that won the gold medal at the 1984 Summer Olympics in Los Angeles, California.

On 21 August 1985, Touré scored in France's 2–0 victory over Uruguay to become the inaugural winners of the CONMEBOL–UEFA Cup of Champions.

Personal life
His father, Bako Touré, was a Malian international footballer.

Honours
Nantes
 Division 1: 1979–80, 1982–83
 Cup of the Alps: 1982

Bordeaux
 Division 1: 1986–87
 Coupe de France: 1986–87

France Olympic
 Summer Olympics: 1984

France
 CONMEBOL–UEFA Cup of Champions: 1985

References

External links
 Profile at Fédération Française de Football

French footballers
French people of Malian descent
France international footballers
Ligue 1 players
FC Nantes players
FC Girondins de Bordeaux players
AS Monaco FC players
Footballers at the 1984 Summer Olympics
Olympic footballers of France
Olympic gold medalists for France
Sportspeople from Nancy, France
1961 births
Living people
Olympic medalists in football
Medalists at the 1984 Summer Olympics
Competitors at the 1979 Mediterranean Games
Mediterranean Games silver medalists for France
Association football midfielders
Mediterranean Games medalists in football